"Days Are Forgotten" is a song by British rock band Kasabian. The song serves as the lead single of the band's fourth studio album, Velociraptor!. The song was first released in Belgium on 12 August, and was later released in the United Kingdom on 9 September 2011 - where it debuted at number 28 on the UK Singles Chart.

Music video
The black-and-white video for the song features the band in an empty room playing animated instruments, drawn with white crayon pencil; singer Tom Meighan sings into a pencil-drawn microphone with a pencil-drawn cable. Throughout the video the music generates soundwaves, also pencil-drawn, which blow up a guitar amplifier and the instruments themselves. At the end of the video, all of the white pencil lines collapse into op art-like geometrical shapes, until the entire environment dissolves into a single line.

Remix
The Z-Trip Remix features the American rapper, entrepreneur and actor LL Cool J. This remix served as the official theme to WWE's TLC: Tables, Ladders & Chairs pay-per-view.

Track listing

Charts

Chart performance
The single made its first appearance on the UK Singles Chart on 15 September 2011, when it debuted at number twenty-eight. On its second week, the single fell fourteen places to number forty-two; before returning to the top 40 at number thirty-six on 2 October - following a price reduction on the UK iTunes store.

Release history

Personnel
Tom Meighan – lead vocals
Sergio Pizzorno – guitars, synths, programming, backing vocals
Chris Edwards – bass
Ian Matthews – drums
Gary Alesbrook – trumpet
Mat Coleman – trombone
Remix
Z-Trip – remixing
LL Cool J – rap vocals

References

2011 singles
Kasabian songs
Songs written by Sergio Pizzorno